Megumi Murakami (村上めぐみ, born 14 September 1985) is a Japanese beach volleyball player. She competed in the 2020 Summer Olympics.

References

External links
 
 
 

1985 births
Living people
People from Echizen, Fukui
Japanese beach volleyball players
Olympic beach volleyball players of Japan
Beach volleyball players at the 2020 Summer Olympics
Asian Games medalists in beach volleyball
Beach volleyball players at the 2014 Asian Games
Beach volleyball players at the 2018 Asian Games
Medalists at the 2018 Asian Games
Asian Games silver medalists for Japan